Hidden 3D is an Italian-Canadian horror film directed by Antoine Thomas and produced by Caramel Films. It was filmed in Italy and Canada over the Summer and Fall of 2010. Hidden 3D was filmed in both 2D and 3D Technologies.

Plot
When his mother dies, Brian Carter is surprised to learn that he has inherited The Sanctuary, home to her controversial experimental addiction treatment center. Having previously believed that the building burned to the ground years ago, Brian travels there with a group of friends and meets Haley, a mysterious friend of his mother, who acts as their guide through the impressive, monastery-like building. During their tour it becomes clear that something sinister lies beneath the surface.

Despite their misgivings, they follow a secret passageway underground and come across strange and unsettling discoveries that trigger Brian's disturbing memories of his mother's research. Ultimately, they are confronted by her terrible secret: Brian's mother built a revolutionary machine that cured people of their addictions but, as a side effect, those addictions materialized in the form of mutant children hungry for human flesh.

Sharing the dark bowels of the building with swarms of firefly-like creatures that they use to lure their victims into death traps, the mutant children begin a wild hunt, with the new visitors as their prey. Fighting to stay alive against the inconceivable, Brian and his friends soon realize that some things are better left hidden.

Cast
Devon Bostick as Lucas
Jason Blicker as Simon
Sean Clement as Brian Carter
Bjanka Murgel as Kimberly
Simonetta Solder as Haley Gable
Jordan Hayes as Vicky
Dawn Ford as Dr Susan Carter
Elliott Larson as Haley's Son
Cristina Rosato as Newsreporter
Allan Kolman as Chester

Release 
The film was released on 21 April 2011, in the US and United Kingdom.

References

External links
 

2011 films
Canadian horror films
Italian horror films
English-language Canadian films
English-language Italian films
Films produced by Don Carmody
2010s English-language films
2010s Canadian films